Hedley William 'Hank' Rushmere (27 April 1913 – May 2002) was a British rower.

Rowing career
He competed in the men's coxless four event at the 1948 Summer Olympics.

He represented England and won a bronze medal in the eights at the 1950 British Empire Games in Auckland, New Zealand.

References

1913 births
2002 deaths
British male rowers
Olympic rowers of Great Britain
Rowers at the 1948 Summer Olympics
Sportspeople from Great Yarmouth
Commonwealth Games medallists in rowing
Commonwealth Games bronze medallists for England
Rowers at the 1950 British Empire Games
Medallists at the 1950 British Empire Games